Kukatush is a rail siding and ghost town in Unorganized North Part of Sudbury District, Ontario, Canada.

The main reason for its existence has been the presence of the Canadian National Railway siding that still functions. Only a few buildings associated with the railway remain and the area is no longer populated.  However, the area has a varied history of fur trading, railway activities, mining exploration, which took place from as early as 1903 until the Kukatush Mining Corporation in the 1950s-60s, logging operations, etc.  At one time there was even a basic landing strip for small aircraft arriving for local tourist outfitters camps.

References

Communities in Sudbury District